Mohammad Jordan Zamorano (born 7 February 2001) is an Indonesian professional footballer who plays as a defensive midfielder for Liga 1 club Persik Kediri, on loan from Liga 1 club Persik Kediri.

Club career

Persik Kediri
He was signed for Persik Kediri to play in Liga 1 in the 2020 season. Jordan made his first-team debut on 29 September 2021 as a substitute in a match against Bhayangkara at the Gelora Bung Karno Madya Stadium, Jakarta.

Career statistics

Club

Notes

References

External links
 Jordan Zamorano at Soccerway
 Jordan Zamorano at Liga Indonesia

2001 births
Living people
Indonesian footballers
Liga 1 (Indonesia) players
Liga 2 (Indonesia) players
Persik Kediri players
Persela Lamongan players
Association football midfielders
People from Kediri (city)
Sportspeople from East Java